Davidoff is a Swiss premium brand of cigars, cigarettes and smoker's accessories. The Davidoff cigarette brand has been owned by  Imperial Brands after purchasing it in 2006. The non-cigarette portion of the Davidoff tobacco brand is owned by Oettinger Davidoff AG, which is based in Basel, Switzerland.

Oettinger Davidoff AG manufactures a broad portfolio of cigars, cigarillos, pipe tobaccos and smoker's accessories under the brands Davidoff, Camacho and Zino Platinum. The cigars are produced in the Dominican Republic and Honduras, and tobacco is sourced from the Dominican Republic, Nicaragua, Brazil, Peru, Mexico, Ecuador, Honduras and the United States of America.

Name

The brand name Davidoff originates from the surname of its Switzerland-Jewish-born founder, Zino Davidoff (born Sussele-Meier Davidoff; 1906, Novhorod-Siverskyi – 1994, Geneva), who ran a tobacco specialist shop in Geneva, Switzerland, from 1926 to 1994. He was known as the "King of Cigars".

History 

After the Second World War, Zino Davidoff decided to acquire a license to produce his own series of cigars. As he had discerning international customers, he named the various formats of this "Château" cigar series after famous Bordeaux vineyard estates. The first in the series was the "Château Latour" in 1946.

In 1967, Zino Davidoff was approached by Cubatabaco, Cuba's state tobacco monopoly, about creating a line of cigars carrying the "Davidoff" name. The cigars were rolled in the newly established El Laguito factory in Havana, which had been established to roll Cuban President Fidel Castro's own personal cigars, named Cohíba.

In 1968, the first cigars carrying the name "Davidoff" were released. The first formats were the No. 1, the No. 2 and the Ambassadrice. In 1970, Oettinger AG, located in Basel, Switzerland, acquired the rights to the Davidoff trademark.

In 1971, the Davidoff "Mini Cigarillos" (short fillers made of 100% tobacco) and, in 1972, the first Davidoff pipe tobaccos were released. As of 1975, the cigars of the Château series were delivered in cabinets bearing the Davidoff logo.

In 1976, the "Mille Series" and, in 1977, the “Dom Pérignon” cigar, named after the champagne, were released. In 1986, a limited release of "Anniversario" cigars were produced, to celebrate Zino Davidoff's 80th birthday.

The Zino Davidoff Group was spun out of Davidoff in 1980 to exclusively market non-tobacco luxury goods such as watches, leather goods, pens, fragrances, eyewear, coffee, and cognac. Public health researchers have suggested that this was in order to engage in trademark diversification (also known as "brand stretching") to promote the tobacco products, because it allows for advertising the brand in the face of restrictions on the direct promotion of tobacco products.

After numerous disputes over quality and ownership rights, Zino Davidoff and Cubatabaco decided to end their relationship. Leading up to this, in August 1989, Zino had publicly burned over one hundred thousand cigars that he had deemed of low quality and unfit to sell. All Davidoff products produced in Cuba were officially discontinued in 1991. An agreement was signed that no more Davidoff cigars from Cuba would be sold.

In 1990, after discontinuing Cuban-made products, Davidoff started to produce cigars in the Dominican Republic. After numerous test runs, Zino Davidoff found a partner in the local producer “Tabadom”, owned by Hendrik Kelner.

In 1991, the first Dominican-made Davidoff cigars were launched, continuing the product lines and cigar formats of their Cuban predecessors. With the move to the Dominican Republic, the Château series was renamed "Grand Cru", and the individual formats were numbered instead of carrying the names of vineyard estates.

In 1991, the limited release called "Aniversario" became an ongoing cigar series, called the "Aniversario" series. In 1992, the "Special" cigar series was released, with the format "Special R" as the first product. In 1994, the 87-year-old Zino Davidoff died in Geneva, Switzerland. In 2001, the "Millennium Blend" cigar series was launched. In 2010, Davidoff Cigars released the "Puro d'Oro" series.

In 2013, Davidoff Cigars released the “Nicaragua” series, which was the first product line of Davidoff to incorporate tobaccos from Nicaragua into the cigar blend, and the first series since the Davidoff Cuban products which made use of tobaccos not sourced in the Dominican Republic. Moving forward, Davidoff Cigars started to make use of tobaccos sourced from other countries than the Dominican Republic to diversify their product portfolio.

In 2015, Davidoff Cigars released the "Escurio" series, which contained tobaccos sourced from Brazil. In the same year, the cigar line "Winston Churchill" was launched. In 2016, Davidoff Cigars released the "Yamasa" cigar series.

Davidoff products today

Current tobacco products
Over the years, Davidoff Cigars made changes to its product lineup. These are the cigar series currently on the market:

Cigars 

 Davidoff Signature
 Davidoff Grand Cru
 Davidoff Aniversario
 Davidoff Millennium
 Davidoff Colorado Claro
 Davidoff Nicaragua & Nicaragua Box Pressed
 Davidoff Escurio
 Davidoff Yamasa
 Davidoff Winston Churchill & The Late Hour
 Davidoff Special Releases (Chinese New Year, Royal Release, 702 Series)
 Davidoff Primeros
 Davidoff Dominicana

Cigarillos 

 Davidoff Mini Cigarillos Silver
 Davidoff Mini Cigarillos Gold
 Davidoff Mini Cigarillos Platinum
 Davidoff Mini Cigarillos Nicaragua
 Davidoff Mini Cigarillos Escurio

Cigarettes 
Imperial Brands has owned the Davidoff cigarette brand name since purchasing it in 2006.

 Davidoff Silver
 Davidoff Gold
 Davidoff Classic
 Davidoff Ice Green/Menthol
 Davidoff One/White
 Davidoff Supreme
 Davidoff Blue
 Davidoff Magenta

Pipe tobaccos 

 Davidoff Flake Medallions
 Davidoff English Mixture
 Davidoff Danish Mixture
 Davidoff Scottish Mixture
 Davidoff Blue Mixture
 Davidoff Red Mixture
 Davidoff Green Mixture
 Davidoff Royalty

Smoker's accessories 
Davidoff Cigars produces a number of smoker's accessories, including humidors, lighters, cigar cutters, ashtrays, cigar cases, pipes and pipe accessories.

See also
 List of cigar brands
 Zino Davidoff Group

Footnotes

Further reading
 Min Ron Nee,  An Illustrated Encyclopaedia of Post-Revolution Havana Cigars (2003, Reprinted: 2005).
 James Suckling, "In Search of Davidoffs: Connoisseurs are Buying Up Stocks of the Swiss Cigar Maker's Discontinued Havanas," Cigar Aficionado, vol. 2, no. 1 (Autumn 1993), pp. 46–55.
 Dieter H. Wirtz, Davidoff - Legend, Myth, Reality, Ullstein Buchverlage GmbH, Berlin 2006

External links

  (may be inaccessible for UK and French internet users because UK and French legislation bans tobacco advertising and promotion)
 Oettinger Davidoff AG – company website

Cigar brands
Cigarette brands
Luxury brands
Swiss watch brands
Perfume houses
Tobacciana
Tobacco companies of Switzerland
Manufacturing companies established in 1906
Swiss brands
Design companies established in 1906
Swiss companies established in 1906